"House of Pain" is a power ballad by American heavy metal band Faster Pussycat. The song was released as the third and final single from the album Wake Me When It's Over. It is the most popular song by the band, peaking at No. 28 on the Billboard Hot 100.

Music video
A music video was filmed for the song, which was directed by Michael Bay.

Track listing
7" single

US 12" single

Spain 12" single

UK 12" single

Cassette single

EP single

Chart positions

Use in other media
The song was featured in the Peacemaker episode "The Choad Less Traveled". Towards the end of the episode, the titular character listens to the song while reflecting on his childhood trauma and turning to drugs and alcohol for support.

Personnel
Faster Pussycat
 Taime Downe – lead vocals
 Greg Steele – guitar, piano, backing vocals
 Brent Muscat – guitar
 Eric Stacy – bass guitar
 Mark Michals – drums, percussion

Additional musicians
 Jimmy Zavala – harmonica

See also
 List of glam metal albums and songs

References

Faster Pussycat songs
1989 songs
1990 singles
Elektra Records singles
Glam metal ballads
Music videos directed by Michael Bay